Sudan competed at the 1992 Summer Olympics in Barcelona, Spain.

Competitors
The following is the list of number of competitors in the Games.

Athletics

Men
Track & road events

Field events

Judo

Men

Weightlifting

Men

References

Sources
Official Olympic Reports
sports-reference

Nations at the 1992 Summer Olympics
1992
OLy